The Horseshoe Tavern (known as The Horseshoe, The 'Shoe, The 'Toronto Tavern' and The 'Triple T' to Toronto locals) is a concert venue at 370 Queen Street West (northeast corner of Queen at Spadina) in downtown Toronto, Ontario, Canada, and has been in operation since 1947. Owned by "JC", Ken Sprackman, Craig Laskey and Naomi Montpetit, the venue is a significant part of Canadian musical lore. It is captured in the memories of thousands of concertgoers, and in books such as Have Not Been the Same.

History 
The building, erected in 1861, previously housed a blacksmith. Originally an 87-seat saloon, it was advertised  in recent decades as a "Country Roots n' Rockabilly Music Tavern". The Horseshoe Tavern welcomed blues and folk artists in the 1960s; reggae, mod, punk and new wave acts in the 1970s and 1980s; and then alternative rock and everything from ska, surf and swing to Celtic music and alternative country from the 1990s onward. Influential acts that have played concerts there include The Rolling Stones, The Police, Etta James, Ramones, The Tragically Hip, Talking Heads and The Jeff Healey Band. Actor Dan Aykroyd was once part-owner.

The Horseshoe has supported up and coming Canadian artists through programs such as Dave Bookman's Nu Music Nite, a regular Tuesday showcase. Bookman was a Toronto radio DJ for Indie 88.  As a result, the club has been a springboard for such notable acts as Stompin' Tom Connors, The Band, Blue Rodeo, The Tragically Hip, Bryan Adams, The Watchmen, Big Sugar, Wide Mouth Mason, Great Big Sea, Prairie Oyster, Our Lady Peace, The Pukka Orchestra and Helix.

The Horseshoe Tavern celebrated its 60th anniversary in 2007 with six shows by Joel Plaskett. Plaskett played his entire catalogue over six consecutive nights, devoting each show to one full album. Special guests appearing at the concerts included Peter Elkas, Sarah Harmer and Gord Downie.

Due to the drastic difference in the amount of daylight Toronto gets from summer to winter, the tavern installed light-enhancing windows, which make it appear as daytime inside the bar even when it is pitch black outside.

Media appearances 

Two Stompin' Tom Connors concert films, This Is Stompin' Tom (1972) and Across This Land with Stompin' Tom (1973) were shot at the Horseshoe. In 1978, the tavern was the setting for Colin Brunton's punk rock documentary The Last Pogo, featuring The Scenics, The Cardboard Brains, The Secrets, The Mods, The Ugly, The Viletones, and Teenage Head.  An archival photo montage of the Horseshoe Tavern's history was also featured in Brunton's 2013 feature film, The Last Pogo Jumps Again.

The Horseshoe was featured on Live on MTV in September 1997, when the Rolling Stones began their Bridges To Babylon Tour there with a 75-minute show. In 1998, the club was acknowledged in the Tragically Hip song "Bobcaygeon." In 2000, it hosted the Humble & Fred "Gift of Christmas" broadcast.
In 2006, a live recording of "Red Flag" by Billy Talent from a performance at the tavern was released on the "Red Flag" CD single. In 2020, Kathleen Edwards referenced the Horseshoe in her song "Glenfern."

Live Releases  

 1971 - Stompin' Tom Connors: Live At The Horseshoe
 1979 - Various Artists: And Now Live From Toronto... The Last Pogo (also a concert film)
 1994 - Various Artists: Kumbaya Album Nineteen Ninety Four (Junkhouse track "Praying For The Rain")
 1994 - Pat Temple And The High Lonesome Players: Cold Cuts 
 1995 - The Mods:	Twenty 2 Months (4 tracks)
 1998 - Edgefest 98 Rarities & Collectables (Watchmen track "Say Something")
 1998 - Watchmen: Live Radar
 2000 - Skydiggers: There And Back (12 tracks, recorded 1998)
 2000 - Wilco: Why Would You Wanna Live (track "Passenger Side", recorded in 1997)
 2001 - Melanie Doane: Melvin Live
 2003 - Chris Bottomley's Brainfudge: Full Frontal Lobottomley Live 1990-1998 (7 tracks, recorded 1994)
 2003 - The Mahones: Live At The Horseshoe
 2004 - Pedro The Lion: Stations (3 tracks
 2004 - Rheostatics: Calling Out The Chords - Vol. 1
 2004 - Various Artists: It's A Team Mint Xmas Vol. 2 
 2006 - Hot Chip: Live At The Horseshoe, Toronto (recorded live 2005)
 2006 - Loudness – Loudness In America 06 (concert film)
 2006 - The Parkas: A Life Of Crime documentary / The Scars To Prove It E.P. (track "My Life Of Crime", recorded 2005)
 2006 - Wolf Eyes: Live At Horseshoe Tavern, Toronto
 2006 - Wolf Eyes / John Wiese: Live Frying: Toronto
 2008 - Sun Ra: Live At The Horseshoe Tavern, Toronto 1978
 2010 - The Master Plan: Maximum Respect (track "Picketts Charge")
 2013 - Skydiggers: All Of Our Dreaming - Live 1988, 2000 & 2012 (10 tracks, recorded 1999)
 2014 - The Tragically Hip: Fully Completely (2014 reissue bonus live disc, recorded 1992)
 2015 - Neko Case: Fox Confessor Brings The Flood (track "John Saw That Number")
 2015 - Teenage Jesus and the Jerks: Live 1977-1979 (three tracks, recorded 1978)
 2016 - The Jeff Healey Band – Live At The Horseshoe Tavern 1993
 2019 - The Unintended: The Unintended (2019 Reissue, Deluxe Version, three tracks recorded 2004)
 2019 - The Hold Steady: Live In Toronto 9-14-18
 2019 - The Hold Steady: Live In Toronto 9-15-18
 2022 - The Hold Steady: Live In Toronto 5-4-22

References

External links

Official site

Music venues in Toronto
Nightclubs in Toronto